Neviusia, the snow-wreaths, is a genus of ornamental plants, which are native to the United States, containing two extant species and one extinct species known from fossil leaves. This genus is a rare example of a disjunct range occurring in North America. The type species, Neviusia alabamensis, occurs in several southeastern states, while second extant species, Neviusia cliftonii, is endemic to the Mt Shasta region of California, and the extinct species Neviusia dunthornei is found in shale deposits in the Okanagan Highlands of Washington and British Columbia. It is named for Episcopal priest and botanist Reuben Nevius.

References 

 

 
Kerrieae
Rosaceae genera
Flora of the United States